The Junior Eurovision Song Contest 2011 was the ninth edition of the annual Junior Eurovision Song Contest, and took place in Yerevan, Armenia at the Karen Demirchyan Sports and Concerts Complex. It was the first time in history of the Junior Eurovision Song Contest that the contest was held in the previous year's winning country. Public Television of Armenia ARMTV was the main organizer of the show, being provided financial aid from the European Broadcasting Union made of entrance fees from the participating broadcasters, while Swedish company HD Resources assisted with the technical side of the production.

The winner was the group Candy from Georgia with the song "Candy Music".  and  finished in second and third place, respectively. This was Georgia's second victory in the Junior Eurovision Song Contest following a previous victory in 2008.

Location

On 18 January 2011, Armenian national broadcaster ARMTV and the European Broadcasting Union (EBU) announced that the 2011 contest would take place in the Karen Demirchyan Sports and Concerts Complex, in Yerevan.

The complex consists of two main halls; the Concerts hall and the Sports hall, in addition to the large foyer, Hayastan conference hall and Argishti hall designated for diplomatic meetings, exhibitions and other events.

Format
On 15 November 2011, it was revealed that Gohar Gasparyan and Avet Barseghyan would be the hosts of the show.

Logo and graphic design
In May 2011, ARMTV announced a competition for children to design the official logo of the contest, which was due to be presented on 1 June. However, in the end the logo was designed by a professional teams from ARMTV, the EBU and Studio of Anton Baranov from Belarus, who also designed logo of Junior Eurovision Song Contest 2010 and was presented on 15 July 2011. The logo depicts equalizer bars in the shape of a mountain, hinting a toy version of the famous Mount Ararat.

The graphics were made by Guðmundur Þór Kárason, from Iceland, who previously worked on the Icelandic children's show LazyTown and was a photographer for the Eurovision Song Contest 2010. The postcards were produced and directed by him alongside Arthur Vardanyan.

Voting rules changes
Changes to the voting included that televoting was possible after all songs had been performed, and not from the beginning of the show as in previous years – returning to the rules active in 2003–2005. Each country's spokesperson also announced all the points during their presentation, due to the lower number of participating countries, as it was done in 2003–2004.

Opening and interval acts
The show was opened with a traditional dance performance. During the interval Molly Sanden performed "Spread a Little Light", whilst Sirusho performed a remixed version of "Qélé, Qélé" and last year's winner Vladimir Arzumanyan also took to the stage.

Participating countries 

On 15 July, the EBU announced that 12 countries would compete in the upcoming contest.  was to compete for the first time, while ,  and  withdrew. On 15 August, it was announced that  had joined the list, returning after a two-year absence from the contest. On 9 September, Latvia reversed its decision to withdraw from the contest and would now send a participant. However, on 7 October it was announced that San Marino would not be present in Armenia as they were not able to find a suitable participant in time for the contest, hoping to send an entry to the 2012 edition. Therefore, a total of 13 countries took part in Armenia.

Returning artists 
Even though rules of Junior Eurovision do not allow participation of returning artists - EBU issued special permission for Russian entry 2011 performed by participant of Junior Eurovision Song Contest 2009 Ekaterina Ryabova, which is first similar case in history of the contest. According to Sietse Bakker, EBU coordinator - EBU may also drop this rule completely, starting from 2012. Notably, Ekaterina had also already applied to national preselection in 2010 as well, but was disqualified following the existing rule.

Participants and results 

Each country gave their votes through a 50% jury and 50% televoting system, which decided their top ten songs using the points 12, 10, 8, 7, 6, 5, 4, 3, 2, and 1.

Detailed voting results

12 points 
Below is a summary of all 12 points received. All countries were given 12 points at the start of voting to ensure that no country finished with nul points; these 12 points were announced by a spokesperson from Australia.

Spokespersons 

The order in which votes were cast during the 2011 contest along with the spokesperson who was responsible for announcing the votes for their respective country.

 Valentin Sadiki
 Šarlote Lēnmane
 Ștefan Roșcovan
 Razmik Arghajanyan
 Samuil Sarandev-Sancho
 Dominykas Žvirblis
 Amanda Koenig
 Anja Veterova
 Anna Lagerweij
 Anna Kovalyova
 Ina-Jane von Herff
 Elene Makashvili
 Jill & Lauren

Broadcasts 

Each national broadcaster sent a commentator to the contest, in order to provide coverage of the contest in their own native language. Details of the commentators and the broadcasting station for which they represented are also included in the table below.

Official album

Junior Eurovision Song Contest Yerevan 2011, is a compilation album put together by the European Broadcasting Union, and was released by Universal Music Group on 25 November 2011. The album features all the songs from the 2011 contest, along with karaoke versions.

See also
 Eurovision Song Contest 2011

References

References

External links

Junior Eurovision Official Website

 
2011
2011 in Armenia
21st century in Yerevan
2011 song contests
Events in Yerevan
December 2011 events in Europe